Roald Morel Larsen (1 February 1898 – 28 July 1959) was a World Champion speed skater from Norway. He was born in Kristiania (now Oslo).
Roald Larsen's parents were Hans Jacob Larsen, a glazier born in Kristiania in 1870, and Lydia Larsen, born in Porsgrunn in 1865. They had four children, all sons: Jaan Harald (1891), Lyder Ragnar (1895), Roald Morel (1898), and Gelgjermo Stone (1899).

Representing Kristiania Skøiteklub (now Oslo Skøiteklub), Larsen had his best year in 1924, when he became World Allround, European Allround, and Norwegian Allround Champion, in addition to winning two silver and three bronze medals at the 1924 Winter Olympics of Chamonix. One of those Olympic silver medals was on the allround event, a combination of the results of the 500 m, the 1500 m, the 5000 m, and the 10000 m – the only time in Olympic history that there was an allround event. Larsen won several more medals in the years that followed, including another bronze medal at the 1928 Winter Olympics of St. Moritz.

Larsen often had to admit defeat to Clas Thunberg. This is illustrated by the fact that at none of the six events in which Larsen won an Olympic medal he managed to finish ahead of Thunberg. 
After 1928, Larsen's appearances and successes quickly became less, although he kept competing occasionally until 1936.

After retiring from speed skating, Larsen followed in his father's footsteps and became a full-time glazier. He founded the glazier company Roald Larsen AS in Oslo in 1937. Larsen died in 1959, at the age of 62. , Roald Larsen AS still exists, and is a full-service construction company.

Medals
An overview of medals won by Larsen at important championships he participated in, listing the years in which he won each:

Source: SpeedSkatingStats.com & Skoyteforbundet.no

Record

World records
Over the course of his career, Larsen skated one world record:

Source: ISU.org

Personal records

Larsen's personal record on the 1000 m equalled Oscar Mathisen's 20-year-old world record on that distance.

Larsen has an Adelskalender score of 194.655 points. His highest ranking on the Adelskalender was a second place.

References

 Roald Larsen at SpeedSkatingStats.com
 Evert Stenlund's Adelskalender pages
 Roald Larsen from Deutsche Eisschnelllauf Gemeinschaft e.V. (the German Skating Association)
 Om Roald Larsen AS (About Roald Larsen Corp.) from Roald Larsen AS – Glassmesterforretning (Roald Larsen Corp. – Glazier Association)

1898 births
1959 deaths
Norwegian male speed skaters
Speed skaters at the 1924 Winter Olympics
Speed skaters at the 1928 Winter Olympics
Olympic speed skaters of Norway
Medalists at the 1924 Winter Olympics
Medalists at the 1928 Winter Olympics
Olympic medalists in speed skating
Olympic silver medalists for Norway
Olympic bronze medalists for Norway
World record setters in speed skating
Sportspeople from Oslo
World Allround Speed Skating Championships medalists